Michael Jordan was an Irish politician. A farmer, he was an unsuccessful candidate at the 1922, 1923 and June 1927 general elections. He was first elected to Dáil Éireann at the September 1927 general election as a Farmers' Party Teachta Dála (TD) for the Wexford constituency. He stood as a Cumann na nGaedheal candidate at the 1932 general election but was not re-elected.

References

Year of birth missing
Year of death missing
Farmers' Party (Ireland) TDs
Cumann na nGaedheal politicians
Members of the 6th Dáil
Politicians from County Wexford
Irish farmers